Woollings Creek is a creek in Timiskaming District and Cochrane District in northeastern Ontario, Canada. It is in the James Bay drainage basin and is a tributary of the Whiteclay River.

Course
The creek begins at Big Finlander Lake in geographic Black Township in the municipality of Black River-Matheson, Cochrane District and heads southeast, then turns curves northeast and then southeast around Gipsy Mountain to reach Meyers Lake. There it enters geographic Lee Township in the Unorganized West Part of Timiskaming District and takes in the right tributary Sarsfield Creek and left tributary Benoit Creek. The creek continues southeast into geographic Maisonville Township and reaches its mouth at Swan Lake, the source of the Whiteclay River. The Whiteclay River flows via the Black River, the Abitibi River and the Moose River to James Bay.

Tributaries
Benoit Creek (left)
Sarsfield Creek (right)

References

Other map sources:

Rivers of Timiskaming District
Rivers of Cochrane District